Defending champion Rafael Nadal defeated Albert Ramos Viñolas in the final, 6–1, 6–3 to win the singles tennis title at the 2017 Monte-Carlo Masters. It was his record-extending 10th Monte Carlo Masters title, becoming the first man in the Open Era to win 10 singles titles at the same tournament. Nadal also claimed his Open Era record 50th clay court title.

Seeds
The top eight seeds receive a bye into the second round.

Draw

Finals

Top half

Section 1

Section 2

Bottom half

Section 3

Section 4

Qualifying

Seeds

Qualifiers

Lucky losers

Qualifying draw

First qualifier

Second qualifier

Third qualifier

Fourth qualifier

Fifth qualifier

Sixth qualifier

Seventh qualifier

External links
 Main draw
 Qualifying draw

Singles